Scartaglin is a Gaelic Athletic Association club from Scartaglen, County Kerry, Ireland.  Founded in 1964, the club fields teams in the East Kerry Division of the GAA county of Kerry. Players from the club also play in the Kerry Senior Football Championship with the divisional side St. Kierans.

Divisional teams
Scartaglin players play with St. Kierans at senior level as a divisional team in the Kerry Senior Football Championship. Other clubs, which contribute players to St. Kierans' teams, include Ballymacelligott, Brosna, Cordal, Currow, Castleisland Desmonds and Knocknagoshel.

Achievements
 Munster Junior B Club Football Championship (1): 2012
 Kerry Novice Football Championship (3): 1983, 2012, 2019.

Notable players
 Padraig Reidy

References

External links
 East Kerry GAA website
 The Examiner - Blues' deadly accuracy sees off brave Duhallow - 1998

Gaelic games clubs in County Kerry
Gaelic football clubs in County Kerry
1964 establishments in Ireland